Legislative elections were held in South West Africa on 19 May 1945. The whites-only election saw a victory for the United National South West Party, which won all 12 elected seats in the Legislative Assembly.

Electoral system
The Legislative Assembly had 18 seats, of which twelve were elected in single-member constituencies, and six were appointed by the territory's Administrator, Petrus Imker Hoogenhout. The twelve constituencies were Gibeon, Gobabis, Grootfontein, Keetmanshoop, Luderitz, Okahandja, Otjiwarongo, Stampriet, Swakopmund, Warmbad, Windhoek Central and Windhoek District.

Results
For the first time, all 12 constituencies were contested. Of the six members appointed by Administrator, four were from the United National South West Party and two from the National Party.

References

South West Africa
1945 in South West Africa
Elections in Namibia
Election and referendum articles with incomplete results
May 1945 events in Africa